The following is the list of ships of the Imperial Japanese Navy for the duration of its existence, 1868-1945. This list also includes ships before the official founding of the Navy and some auxiliary ships used by the Army. For a list of ships of its successor, the Japan Maritime Self-Defense Force, see List of active Japan Maritime Self-Defense Force ships and List of combatant ship classes of the Japan Maritime Self-Defense Force.

Early warships
 Atakebune, 16th century coastal battleships.
 Red seal ships – Around 350 armed sailships, commissioned by the Bakufu in the early 17th century, for Asian and South-East Asian trade.
  (1607) – Built by William Adams for Tokugawa Ieyasu. Crossed the Pacific in 1610.
  (1614) – One of Japan's first Western-style sail warships, transported the embassy of Hasekura Tsunenaga to America in 1614.

Early modern warships

Western-style sail warships

  (1854) – Japan's first post-seclusion Western-style sail warship.
  (1854)
  (1856)

Steam warships
 Kankō Maru (1855), Japan's first steam warship.
  (1855) – Japan's first screw-driven steam warship
  (1858)
  (1866)
 
 
 
 
 
 (:ja:陽春丸)
 
  (1863), Japan's first domestically-built steam warship.
 (:ja:飛龍丸)
 
  (1864) 
 
 
 (:ja:第二回天)

Corvettes and gunboats
  
  (1877)
  (1877)
 
 
 
 
 
 
 
 
  (1882, ex-Chinese, captured 1895)

Battleships

Pre-dreadnoughts

Prizes of the Russo-Japanese War

Battleships

Coastal defense ships

Transitional Dreadnoughts

Battleship prizes of World War I

Battlecruisers

In commission during World War II

Old battleships 

 
‡ Before conversion to hybrid aircraft carriers

Super battleships

Seaplane tenders 
  (1913)
 Notoro (1920)
 Akitsushima
 Kamoi
  (converted to aircraft carriers)

Aircraft carriers

  (1921)
  (1925)
  (1928)
  (1931)
  (1935)
  (1937)
 
  (1939)
  (1939)
 
  (1940)
  (1941)
 
  (1941)
  (1941)
  escort carrier
  (liner converted to escort carrier in 1941)
  (liner converted to escort carrier in 1942)
  (liner converted to escort carrier in 1942)
  (liner converted to escort carrier in 1942) (liner converted to escort carrier in 1943)
  (used by the Army)
  (1941, depot ship and escort carrier)
  (1942, depot ship without flight deck)
  (converted from submarine tender in 1942)

  (1943)
  light aircraft carriers
  (1943)
  (1944)
 
  (1943)
  (1943)
  (1944)
  (not completed)
 Aso (not completed)
 Ikoma (not completed)
 Shin'yō (1943)
  (1944)
  escort carrier
  (1944)
 Otakisan Maru (not completed)
  auxiliary escort carrier (used by the Army)
  (1944)
 Chigusa Maru (not completed)
  (1945) (used by the Army)

Cruisers

Protected cruisers

Prizes of Russo-Japanese War

Armored cruisers

Other cruisers

Dispatch vessels

Foreign built

In commission during World War II

Old light cruisers

Heavy cruisers

New light cruisers

Destroyers

1st Class destroyers
  (1915)

 
  (1916–1917)

 
 
 
  (1917-1919 on loan from the Royal Navy)
 (HMS Nemesis)
  (HMS Minstrel)
  (1917–1918)

 
  (1919–1922)

 
 
 
 
 
 
 
 
 
 
 
 
 
 
 Kamikaze class (1922–1925)

 
 
 
 
 
 
 
 

  (1925–1927)

 
 
 
 
 
 
 
 
 
 
 

  (1927–1931)

 
 
 
 
 
 
 
 
 
 
 
 
 
 
 
 
 
 
 

 Akatsuki class (1931–1932)
 
 
 
 

  (1932–1934)
 
 
 
 
 
 

  (1935–1937)
 
 
 
 
 
 
 
 
 
 

  (1936–1937)
 
 
 
 
 
 
 
 
 
 

  (1938–1941)
 
 
 
 
 
 
 
 
 
 
 
 
 
 
 
 
 
 
 
  (1941–1944)
 
 
 
 
 
 
 
 
 
 
 
 
 
 
 
 
 
 
 

 Akizuki class (1941–1944)
 
 
 
 
 
 Michizuki (not completed)
 
 
 
 
 
 
 

 Shimakaze class (1942)
 

  (1944–1948)
 
 
 
 
 
 
 
 
 
 
 
 
 
 
 
 
 
 
 
 
  (1944–1945)
 Azusa (not launched)
 
 
 
 
 Hishi (not launched)
 
 
 Katsura (not completed)
 
 Kuzu (not launched)
  – later the 
 
 
 Sakaki (not launched)
 
 
 
 Tochi (not completed)
 
 Wakazakura (not launched)
 Yadake (not completed)
 Yaezakura (not completed)

2nd Class destroyers
  (1911-1912)
 
 
  (1915)
 
 
 
 
 
 
 
 
 
 
  (1916–1917)
 
 
 
 
  (1917–1918)
 
 
 
 
 
 
  (1919–1922)
 
 
 
 
 
 
 
 
 
 
 
 
 
 
 
 
 
 
 
 
 
  (1922–1923)

3rd Class destroyers
  (1898–1922)
 
 
 
 
 
 
  (1898–1926)
 
 
 
 
 
 
  (1901–1920)
 
 
  (1901–1926)
 
 
  (1902–1926)
 
 
 
 
 
 
 
  (1905–1930)

Torpedo boats
  (1899–1923)
 
  (1899–1923)
 
 
 
 
 
 
 
 
 
 
 
 
 
 
 
  (1933)
 
 
 
 
  (1935–1937)

River gunboats
 
 
 
  (ex-Italian minelayer Lepanto)
  (ex-)
 
 
 
 
 
 
 
 
 
 
 
  (ex-)
  (ex-)
 Kozakura-class traffic boat

Minesweepers
 No.1 class
 No.13 class
 No.7 class
 No.19 class
 Aux. No.1 class

Patrol vessels
  (驅潛特務艇第一號型): Over 200 built during World War II, 81 lost.
List of IJN Patrol Vessels can be found here at 
 
 Patrol Boat No. 1 (ex-) 
 Patrol Boat No. 2 (ex-) 
 
 Patrol Boat No. 31 (ex-) 
 Patrol Boat No. 32 (ex-) 
 Patrol Boat No. 33 (ex-) 
 Patrol Boat No. 34 (ex-) 
 Patrol Boat No. 35 (ex-) 
 Patrol Boat No. 36 (ex-) 
 Patrol Boat No. 37 (ex-) 
 Patrol Boat No. 38 (ex-) 
 Patrol Boat No. 39 (ex-) 
 Patrol Boat No. 46 (ex-) 
 Patrol Boat No. 101 (ex-) 
 Patrol Boat No. 102 (ex-) 
 Patrol Boat No. 103 (ex-) 
 Patrol Boat No. 104 (ex-HNLMS Valk) 
 Patrol Boat No. 105 (ex-Arayat) 
 Patrol Boat No. 106 (ex-) 
 Patrol Boat No. 107 (ex-) 
 Patrol Boat No. 108 (ex-HNLMS Arend) 
 Patrol Boat No. 109 (ex-HNLMS Fazant)

Minelayers

Submarines

1st Class submarines
 Junsen class
 Type J1, 4 units, .
 Type J1M, .
 Type J2, .
 Type J3,  2 units, .
 Kou class
 Type A1, 3 units, .
 Type A2, .

 Type AM, 2 units, .
 Otsu class
 Type B1, 20 units, .
 Type B2, 6 units, .
 Type B3, 3 units, .
 Hei class
 Type C1, 5 units, .
 Type C2, 3 units, .

 Type C3, 3 units, .
 Tei class
 Type D1, 12 units,  (S51B).
 Type D2, .
 Kaidai class
 Type KD1, .
 Type KD2,  (ex-I-52).
 Type KD3a, 4 units,  (ex-I-53),  (ex-I-54),  (ex-I-55),  (ex-I-58).
 Type KD3b, 5 units,  (ex-I-56),  (ex-I-57),  (ex-I-59), .
 Type KD4, 3 units,  (ex-I-62),  (ex-I-64)
 Type KD5, 3 units,  (ex-I-65),  (ex-I-66), 
 Type KD6a, 6 units,  (ex-I-68),  (ex-I-69),  (ex-I-71),  (ex-I-72), .
 Type KD6b, 2 units,  (ex-I-74),  (ex-I-75).
 Type KD7, 10 units,  (ex-I-76), .

 Sentoku type, 3 units,  (I-404 not launched, I-405 not completed).
 Sentaka type, 3 units,  (I-204 to I-208 not completed).
 Senho type,  (I-352 not completed).
 Kiraisen (Mine layer) type, 4 units  (ex-I-21),  (ex-I-22),  (ex-I-23),  (ex-I-24).
 Captured German submarines, 6 units, I-501 (ex-), I-502 (ex-), I-503 (ex-UIT-24, ex-), I-504 (ex-UIT-25, ex-), I-505 (ex-), I-506 (ex-).

2nd Class submarines

 Type F
 Type F1,  2 units, .
 Type F2, 3 units, .
 Kaichū type
Type K1, 2 units, .
Type K2, 3 units, .
Type K3, 10 units, .
Type K4, 3 units, .
Type KT (Toku-Chū), 5 units,, Submarine No. 70, .
Type K6, 2 units, .
Type KS (Sen-Chū), 18 units, .
 Type L
 Type L1, 2 units, .
 Type L2, 4 units, .
 Type L3, 3 units, .
 Type L4, 9 units, .
 Ko Type, 18 units, .
 Sen'yu-Shō Type, 10 units, ',  (Ha-110 and Ha-112 not completed) 
 Sentaka-Shō Type, 11 units,  (Ha-206, Ha-211 to Ha-215, Ha-217 to Ha-279 not completed)
 Ex-German submarines, 2 units, Ro-500 (ex-), Ro-501 (ex-).

3rd Class submarines

 , 101 units.
 , about 250 units (750 planned).
 Kaiten, about 1000 units.
 C1 type
 C2 type
 S1 type
 Kawasaki class
 S2 type
 No.71, ,71-gou

Army submarines
 Type 3 submergence transport vehicle

Other submarines
 
 modified Holland class

Suicide vessels
 Shinyo, 6,200 units.
 Kaiten, approx. 420 units.

See also
 Japanese ship naming conventions
 Japanese destroyers of World War II
 List of sunken aircraft carriers
 List of aircraft carriers by country
 List of battleships of Japan
 List of battlecruisers of Japan
 List of cruiser classes of the Imperial Japanese Navy
 List of cruisers of Japan
 List of destroyers of Japan

References

External links
 MaritimeQuest Japanese Destroyer Index
 MaritimeQuest Akatsuki Class Destroyers Overview
 MaritimeQuest Akizuki Class Destroyers Overview
 MaritimeQuest Hatsuharu Class Destroyers Overview
 MaritimeQuest Matsu Class Destroyer Overview
 MaritimeQuest Minekaze Class Destroyers Overview
 MaritimeQuest Kamikaze Class Destroyers Class Overview
 MaritimeQuest Japanese Battleship Index
 Japanese gunboats in Japanese, with photo
 Japanese gunboats in Japanese, with photo
  Materials of IJN
  Monograph 144 Chapter II

Lists of ships of Japan